The 1991 Brentwood Borough Council election took place on 2 May 1991 to elect members of Brentwood Borough Council in England.

Results summary

Ward results

Brentwood North

Brentwood South

Brentwood West

Brizes & Doddinghurst

Herongate & Ingrave

Hutton East

Hutton North

Hutton South

Ingatestone & Fryerning

Mountnessing

Pilgrims Hatch

Shenfield

Warley

References

1991
1991 English local elections